Okey McCabe (1904 – 19 November 1977) was a South African cricket umpire. He stood in one Test match, South Africa vs. New Zealand, in 1953.

See also
 List of Test cricket umpires

References

1904 births
1977 deaths
Place of birth missing
South African Test cricket umpires